Altınlı can refer to:

 Altınlı, Çankırı
 Altınlı, Taşova